Elmer Ellsworth Warner (May 1, 1861 – February 17, 1943) was a politician from Pennsylvania.

References

1861 births
1943 deaths
Republican Party Pennsylvania state senators
20th-century American politicians